The Chevrolet 90° V6 family of V6 engines began in 1978 with the Chevrolet  as the base engine for the all new 1978 Chevrolet Malibu. The original engine family was phased out in early 2014, with its final use as the  V6 engine used in Chevrolet and GMC trucks and vans. Its phaseout marks the end of an era of Chevrolet small-block engine designs dating back to the 1955 model year. A new Generation V  V6 variant entered production in late 2013, based on the LT1 small block V8 used in the 2014 Chevrolet Silverado.

Generation I 
These engines have a 90° V-block with 12 valves activated by a pushrod valvetrain. All engines have cast iron blocks and cylinder heads. The engines are based on the Chevrolet Small-Block engine, and the V6 is formed by the removal of the #3 and #6 cylinders. The V6s share the same  bore spacing and  deck height as the V8 engines. Many parts are interchangeable between the 90° V6 and the small block V8 including valvetrain components, some bearings, piston assemblies, lubrication and cooling system components, and external accessories. The 90-degree V6 engine uses the same transmission bellhousing pattern as the Chevrolet small-block V8 engine. The oil pan dipstick is located on the passenger side above the oil pan rail; this design was phased in on both the V6-90 and Small Block Chevrolet assembly lines (for engines manufactured after 1979) sharing the same casting dies. All the engines use a 1-6-5-4-3-2 firing order. The engines in this family are longitudinal engines, and have been used in rear-wheel drive cars and trucks, industrial, and marine applications. Until 2014, the Chevrolet 90° V6 was produced at the GM Powertrain Division plant in Romulus, Michigan.

3.3L (200 CID) 

Introduced in 1978, the  replaced the larger  as the base engine for Chevrolet's new downsized intermediate line. The  used a unique  bore and stroke (the Chevrolet  V8 engines shared the same stroke dimension). These bore and stroke dimensions were later used by the  V8 Chevrolet engine. Also like the small block V8 engines, the  V6 used  main bearings and  rod bearing diameters.

Being a 90-degree V6, Chevrolet took steps to eliminate the rough running tendencies of the 200. The crankshaft has each of its connecting rod throws offset by 18 degrees for each pair of rods. This required the connecting rods to have  narrower ends as well as a thrust bearing to be installed between each pair of rods. However, the connecting rods were still the same  length as most other small-block Chevrolet V8 engines. This produced an engine with a semi-even fire sequence of 132 degrees/108 degrees.

The  V6 was only produced for 1978 and 1979. It was available only with a 2-barrel carburetor. In 1978, the  used the Rochester 2GC carburetor and in 1979 it used a Rochester Dualjet carburetor. The smaller Dualjet carburetor caused a slight decrease in power.

3.8L (229 CID) 

The  engine was first introduced for the 1980 model year. This engine replaced the  straight-six in full-size Chevrolets and Camaros as the new base V6. Checker Motors Corporation also used this engine starting with its 1980 A11 Taxi and A12 Marathon sedans. Both the Buick V6 and the  Chevrolet V6 are 90-degree V6 engines, and both are often referred to as the 3.8L V6. These engines should not be confused as being the same, and are unique engine designs.

The  has a  bore and stroke, identical to the Chevrolet  V8 engine. The  used the same  main bearing and  rod bearing diameters as the  V6 engine. Also like the  V6, the  used the same crankshaft with the 18-degree offset throws and the same  connecting rods with  narrowed ends. It came equipped with  intake valves and  exhaust valves. The  V6 was only equipped with a 2-barrel carburetor. For 1980 the  used a mechanical Dualjet. From 1981 to 1984 the electronic Dualjet was used along with the GM's CCC (Computer Command Control) system.

4.3L (262 CID) 

The  V6 is the last and most successful engine in the Chevrolet 90-degree V6 engine family. This engine was introduced in 1985 as a replacement for the  V6 in the full-size Chevrolet, the Chevrolet El Camino and Chevrolet Monte Carlo.

The  V6 has a  bore and stroke, identical to the  Chevrolet V8 engine. To create a true even fire engine, Chevrolet produced a crankshaft with 30-degree offsets between each rod pin. Consequently, rod journals were increased to a larger . The  also used larger valves than the  V6, with a  intake valve and a  exhaust valve (also shared with the 350).

In 1986 and 1987, the  engine saw engine design upgrades similar to the Chevrolet small block V8.  In 1986, the rear main crankshaft oil seal was changed from a two piece to a one piece seal. Some 1985 model year vehicles would have a 1986 engine due to service replacement - cylinder blocks were shipped with oil pans. 1987 saw new center bolt valve covers and hydraulic roller lifters.

For the 1992 model year, the  had its block design modified to allow a balance shaft to be installed. It is gear driven off the camshaft timing sprocket, and therefore a new timing chain cover was required for these balanced 4.3L V6s. Balance shaft engines do not have provisions for a mechanical fuel pump unlike the non-balance shaft motors which retained the cast in boss.

This resulted in a new design timing cover with a wider bottom flange, making it incompatible with the 1996-06 LU3/L35.

As of March 7, 2014, the last  engine rolled off the line at Romulus Powertrain. Chevrolet Performance still lists the LU3 motor in their product catalog. Mercury Marine, which sells its engines under the MerCruiser brand developed the 4.5L V6 Mercruiser Engine, producing 200HP and 250HP each, based on the  architecture using similar dimensions.

LB1 and LB4 

The LB1 used in trucks and vans was referred to as Vortec in Chevrolet literature (named after a combustion chamber design known as a swirl port which twists the fuel mix from the intake ports as introduced on the Cavalier 2.0L motor), and this name continued to be used with all truck and van  V6s until present day.

This engine remained unchanged until 1990 when it was last used in taxi (RPO 9C6) and Police (RPO 9C1) Chevrolet Caprices. In 1986 the Chevrolet Astro and GMC Safari vans used the fuel-injected LB4 instead of the LB1. The mechanical fuel pump boss was retained but the hole was undrilled (marine applications had the fuel pump boss drilled and tapped). In 1988 the S-series trucks and S-Blazer and Jimmys had the LB4  as an available option (the accessory drive was upgraded to a serpentine belt drive), which later replaced the 2.8 as the base V6. The LB4 continued until 1996 with minor variations in power, but without any major change. While a majority of LB4s did not have a balance shaft, some 1994 model year engines may have a balance shaft since production of the cylinder block used on the L35 was phased in for both induction systems. The 1994 model year was the final time a non-balance shaft cylinder block was used; production 1995 TBI engines were all balance shaft engines.

Legend

 1 - Chevrolet C/K Trucks, GMC C/K Trucks
 2 - Chevrolet G-Series Vans, GMC G-Series Vans
 3 - Chevrolet Astro vans, GMC Safari Vans - NOTE - LB1 for 1985 only & LB4 not available 1995
 4 - 1985 Chevrolet Impala, 1985–1988 Chevrolet Caprice, 1989–1990 Chevrolet Caprice Police/Taxi only, 1985–1986 Pontiac Parisienne
 5 - 1985–1988 Chevrolet El Camino, GMC Caballero, Chevrolet Monte Carlo, 1986–1987 Pontiac Grand Prix - NOTE -  LB4 used 1986 only
 6 - 1988–1994 Chevrolet S-10 Blazer, GMC S-15 Jimmy and 1991 Oldsmobile Bravada
 7 - 1988–1995 Chevrolet S-10 and GMC S-15 Sonoma

LU2 

For the 1990–1991 model years a high-output  V6 was an available option for the Chevrolet Astro and GMC Safari vans. The LU2 used unique hypereutectic, strutless pistons and a more aggressive camshaft. This engine was replaced in 1992 with the L35.

Legend

 1 - Chevrolet Astro vans, GMC Safari Vans - optional on extended length models

L35 CPI 

This system had one centrally located fuel injector to distribute fuel to six hoses each with a poppet valve to each of the intake ports. This system allowed for a multi-point fuel injection, using one injector. The fuel injection was a batch fire system and used a two piece cast aluminum dual-plenum manifold. This engine was available in Chevrolet S-10 and GMC Sonoma pickups, Chevrolet S-10 Blazer/GMC S-15-Jimmy, and Oldsmobile Bravada SUVs, and Chevrolet Astro and GMC Safari vans only.

The cylinder block was redesigned for use with a balance shaft. Cylinder heads (10238181 casting) used with the L35 will have intake ports with eyebrows that clear the fuel injectors. Timing cover flange area was thickened in 1995 when some of the balance shaft motors had a 6 bolt timing cover - some engines had a crankshaft position sensor (in conjunction with a redesigned distributor containing a pickup assembly which functions as a camshaft position sensor) when OBDII was phased in.

Legend

 1 - Chevrolet Astro vans, GMC Safari Vans - NOTE std on AWD, opt on 2WD models
 2 - Chevrolet S-10 Blazer, GMC Jimmy and Oldsmobile Bravada - NOTE - Oldsmobile Bravada not produced in 1995
 3 - Chevrolet S-10 and GMC Sonoma (engine standard equipment with the S-10 SS and Sonoma GT)

L35 and LF6 SCPI and MPFI 

Major design changes were made to the  V6 for the 1996 model year. Like other small block Chevrolet V8s, the  engine received redesigned heads which had improved airflow and combustion efficiency. These heads are referred to as Vortec heads.

The engine block was revised with structural reinforcing ribs up front eliminating the two freeze plugs (on the front and back) along with an alloy oil pan (for the S10, Blazer, and Jimmy). The 1996+ cast aluminum oil pan has 12 bolts where a 16 bolt oil pan from the earlier 4.3 does not interchange. These  (1996-2000) came with a redesigned 4L60-E transmission with a removable bellhousing which bolts to the oil pan.

Crankshafts manufactured for the 1999 model year (to the end of  production) had a pilot hole depth of  when coupled to the LSx-based 4L60E, which had a redesigned torque converter pilot hub which is longer and used with a  stator shaft). The torque converter pilot hub is longer than the early 4L60E (similar in appearance to the 700R4 c. 1993-95) or the second generation variants (incorporating a removable bellhousing) with the GMT330 or 1996-2000 C/K series.

Only the S-series pick-ups used the LF6, while the full-size trucks, vans and Blazer and Jimmy used the L35 version. The L35 was optional on the S-Series trucks.

Legend

 1 - Chevrolet C/K Trucks, GMC C/K Trucks
 2 - Chevrolet Express, GMC Savana Vans
 3 - Chevrolet Astro vans, GMC Safari Vans
 4 - Chevrolet Blazer, GMC Jimmy, 1996–2001 Oldsmobile Bravada
 5 - Chevrolet S-10 and GMC Sonoma
 7 - Chevrolet Silverado and GMC Sierra trucks

LU3 and LG3 MPFI 

2002 saw major changes to the  fuel-injection system. For 2002 California emission Chevrolet Astros, GMC Safaris, Chevrolet Silverados and GMC Sierras all came equipped with the updated LU3 . 2003 saw the L35 discontinued and the LU3 replacing it in all other applications. A new variation was also introduced in 2003, the LG3.  For 2004 to 2009 the LU3 has been the only  produced.

The biggest change to the LU3 and LG3 was the fuel-injection system. These engines used a multipoint fuel-injection system, with six Multec II fuel injectors mounted at each intake port on the manifold. GM recommends the Multec II spider assembly (which is also available for the L30 and L31 small block V8 motors) as a replacement for the 1996-2002 SCPI injector/spider assembly since the poppet valves have been known to stick open. The sticking poppet valves have been attributed to ethanol fuel blends sold in the State of California. The composite upper intake manifold and cast aluminum lower intake from the L35 engine is also used on the LU3. The LG3 uses a cast aluminum upper intake and a cast iron lower intake. The lower intake eliminated the EGR valve.

The LU3 also received a "quiet cam" to help reduce vibration at both idle and high engine speeds. This camshaft used the same lift and duration as the older design, but the cam was reprofiled to keep the valve lifters in full contact with the cam lobes as the cam ramps down.

The LG3 was used in Chevrolet and GMC S-series pickups and was only produced for 2003. The LU3 was used in the Chevrolet and GMC full-size trucks and vans, the Chevrolet Astro and GMC Safari vans and the Chevrolet S-10 Blazer and GMC S-15 Jimmy.

For the 2007+ GMT900 Silverado/Sierra trucks, the LU3 engine received a Distributorless Ignition System - the traditional distributor was eliminated where a stub shaft was used. Also the crankshaft sensor was upgraded to a 58x reluctor wheel (same as the GEN IV LSx) which resulted in the timing cover redesigned (this time the cover is aluminum alloy in lieu of the composite cover; the timing cover bolt pattern is not the same as the 1996-06 LU3 and L35.

Legend

 1 - Chevrolet Silverado and GMC Sierra trucks
 2 - Chevrolet Express, GMC Savana Vans
 3 - Chevrolet Astro vans, GMC Safari Vans
 4 - Chevrolet Blazer and GMC Jimmy
 5 - Chevrolet S-10 and GMC Sonoma (2WD)
 6 - Chevrolet S-10 and GMC Sonoma (4WD)

Turbocharged LB4 4.3L V6 

In 1991 GMC introduced the GMC Syclone limited edition truck that used a turbocharged  V6. This engine used a Mitsubishi TD06-17C turbocharger, Garrett Water/Air intercooler and electronic multi-point fuel injection. Although GM made these modifications to the engine, it was still referred to with the RPO LB4 code. The majority of the naturally aspirated LB4's long-block was shared with the turbo version. However, the vehicles that used the  turbo engine also included RPO code ZR9. Internal engine upgrades included nodular iron main bearing caps, graphite composite head gaskets with stainless steel flanges and hypereutectic pistons which lowered the engine compression to 8.35:1. A unique intake manifold that used the  twin-bore throttle body from the 5.7L TPI Corvette engine was used on the engine's top end.

The Turbocharged  was last used in the GMC Typhoon in the 1993 model year.

Generation V

4.3L (262 CID) 
Commencing with the 2014 model year, a new LV3 EcoTec3 4300, based on GM's GEN V (LT1) Small Block V8, became the new base motor for the next generation Chevrolet Silverado/GMC Sierra light duty trucks, and was phased in throughout the rest of the truck/van line after the 2015 model year.  This aluminum block and head design was significantly different from the cast iron block and head engine it replaced, signalling an end to a design dating back to 1955. Like its small block V8 counterparts, GM Powertrain also sells the motor for marine and industrial applications.

LV3

The  LV3 V6 is an all new engine announced by GM at the end of 2012. GM considers this a new engine design which inherits from its predecessors its displacement, 2-valve pushrod valvetrain, 90-degree cylinder angle, and  bore centers. It is based on the fifth generation LT engine and includes the same features such as direct injection, piston cooling jets, active fuel management, variable displacement oil pump, continuously variable valve timing and aluminum cylinder heads and block. Emissions are controlled by a close-coupled catalytic converter, Quick Sync 58X ignition, returnless fuel rail, fast-response O2 sensor. It was launched in the all-new 2014 Chevrolet Silverado 1500 and 2014 GMC Sierra 1500. 2021 will be its final model year in Chevrolet Silverado and GMC Sierra, due to the phase-out of the 6-speed automatic transmission. Chevrolet Express and GMC Savana are the last vehicles to use the 4.3L but do not feature Active Fuel Management and their version of the engine is referred to as the LV1.

Applications:
 2014–2021 Chevrolet Silverado 1500
 2014–2021 GMC Sierra 1500

LV1
The LV1 engine is essentially the same as the LV3, but without Active Fuel Management technology. The LV1 made its debut in the 2018 model year GM full-size vans — the 2018 Chevrolet Express and 2018 GMC Savana.
 2018-present Chevrolet Express
 2018-present GMC Savana

See also
 GM High Value engine, 3.5 and 3.9 V6s
 Chevrolet small-block engine
 General Motors small-block engine

Notes

References 

 
 
 

90-Degree V6 engine
V6 engines
Gasoline engines by model